Bror Wiberg (14 June 1890 – 18 June 1935) was a Finnish footballer. He competed in the men's tournament at the 1912 Summer Olympics.

References

External links
 

1890 births
1935 deaths
Finnish footballers
Finland international footballers
Olympic footballers of Finland
Footballers at the 1912 Summer Olympics
Footballers from Turku
Association football forwards
HIFK Fotboll players